Alkires Mills is an unincorporated community in Lewis County, West Virginia, United States.

The first post office at the place was opened in 1854.

References 

Unincorporated communities in West Virginia
Unincorporated communities in Lewis County, West Virginia